UK Power Networks (UKPN) is a distribution network operator for electricity covering South East England, the East of England and London. It manages three licensed distribution networks (Eastern Power Networks, South Eastern Power Networks and London Power Networks) which together cover an area of  square kilometres and approximately eight million customers.

In 2014 UK Power Networks was awarded £25 million from the electricity regulator Ofgem's Low Carbon Networks Fund for the Low Carbon London project.  In 2011 it was awarded £6.7 million by Ofgem for another project, Flexible Plug and Play, which is researching new ways, technical and commercial, to connect renewable energy to the distribution network in Cambridgeshire.
As well as the three distribution arms UK Power Networks also operates UK Power Networks Services Holdings Limited, which develops and maintains electrical networks for customers including London Underground, Heathrow and Stansted airports, Docklands Light Railway and Canary Wharf.

History
The area originally comprised three networks: the London Electricity Board, the Eastern Electricity Board and the South Eastern Electricity Board, known as SEEBOARD, before being brought together by EDF Energy to form EDF Energy Networks.
UK Power Networks began operations in October 2010 after the sale of EDF Energy Networks to 
the Cheung Kong Group for a reported £5.5 billion.

UK Power Networks maintains the electricity networks including the lines and electricity cables. There are 14 distribution network operators (DNOs), each responsible for a different area of the country. These DNOs are all regulated by the Office of Gas and Electricity Markets (Ofgem).

Ownership
UK Power Networks is owned by Cheung Kong Infrastructure Holdings, 40%, Power Assets Holdings, 40%,  and The Li Ka Shing Foundation, 20%.

Open Data Portal 

See also
 History of EDF Energy Networks

References

External links

Electric power distribution network operators in the United Kingdom
CK Hutchison Holdings